The 1940 New York Yankees season was the team's 38th season. New York was managed by Joe McCarthy. Their home games were played at Yankee Stadium. The team finished in third place with a record of 88–66, finishing two games behind the American League champion Detroit Tigers and one game behind the second-place Cleveland Indians.

Offseason 
 October 14, 1939: Hank Sauer was drafted from the Yankees by the Cincinnati Reds in the 1939 minor league draft.

Regular season

Season standings

Record vs. opponents

Roster

Player stats

Batting

Starters by position 
Note: Pos = Position; G = Games played; AB = At bats; R = Runs; H = Hits; Avg. = Batting average; HR = Home runs; RBI = Runs batted in; SB = Stolen Bases

Other batters 
Note: G = Games played; AB = At Bats; R = Runs; H = Hits; Avg. = Batting average; HR = Home runs; RBI = Runs batted in; SB = Stolen bases

Pitching

Starting pitchers 
Note: G = Games pitched; IP = Innings pitched; W = Wins; L = Losses; ERA = Earned run average; SO = Strikeouts

Other pitchers 
Note: G = Games pitched; IP = Innings pitched; W = Wins; L = Losses; ERA = Earned run average; SO = Strikeouts

Relief pitchers 
Note: G = Games pitched; W = Wins; L = Losses; SV = Saves; ERA = Earned run average; SO = Strikeouts

Farm system 

LEAGUE CHAMPIONS: Newark, Binghamton, Amsterdam, Akron, Butler

Arkansas–Missouri League folded, July 1, 1940

Notes

References 
1940 New York Yankees at Baseball Reference
1940 New York Yankees team page at www.baseball-almanac.com

New York Yankees seasons
New York Yankees
New York Yankees
1940s in the Bronx